The Niskanen Center is a Washington, D.C.-based think tank that advocates environmentalism, immigration reform, civil liberties, and strengthening social insurance around market-oriented principles. The center is named after William A. Niskanen, an economic adviser to President Ronald Reagan. The Center states that its "main audience is Washington insiders," and characterizes itself as a moderate think tank.

History 
The Niskanen Center was founded in early 2015 by Jerry Taylor. At its launch, the center was composed primarily of former staffers of the Cato Institute who departed in the wake of a 2012 leadership struggle pitting Ed Crane against the Koch Brothers for control of the libertarian think tank. Taylor and vice president Joe Coon publicly aligned themselves with Crane during the dispute. Both departed shortly after Crane was replaced by John Allison as Cato's president as part of the settlement with the Kochs.

Funding for the center includes donors who seek to counter libertarian conservative hostility to anti-global warming measures. North Carolina businessman Jay Faison, a Republican donor, made an early contribution to the Niskanen Center to spur public climate education but has ceased all ties to the organization in recent years. They include the Open Philanthropy Project, which supports the center's work to expand legal immigration, the Lawrence Linden Trust for Conservation, which provided the Niskanen Center with a grant "to develop and analyze a potential economy-wide carbon tax", and a $400,000 operations grant from the Hewlett Foundation.

In May 2022, the organization announced that Ted Gayer, an executive vice president at the Brookings Institution, would serve as the Niskanen's next president. Gayer started in his role on August 1, 2022.

Policy areas 
The Niskanen Center focuses on a number of distinct areas of public policy including climate change, social insurance policy, healthcare, immigration reform, and technology and civil liberties.

Climate change 
The Niskanen Center advocates the imposition of a global carbon tax for the purpose of offsetting global warming and the effects of climate change. The Center also endorses the understanding of climate change as anthropogenic and believes that government action is a necessary component of mitigating the risks associated with long term sea level rise and extreme weather events associated with climate change.

The Niskanen Center's support for carbon taxation represents a nearly complete reversal of Taylor's previous advocacy at the Cato Institute, where he was a vocal climate change skeptic. Taylor explained his shift in a 2015 interview with Vox, indicating that he had "fundamentally switched" his previous beliefs on the issue after seeing new scientific evidence and the more general strengthening over time of the case for the dangers of climate change, as well as arguments from fellow libertarians about responses to the challenge of climate change that were consistent with, and even required by, a libertarian political stance.

In November 2015 the Niskanen Center announced the founding of a new Center for Climate Science under the direction of Dr. Joseph Majkut, a climatologist who previously served on the staff of Sen. Sheldon Whitehouse (D-RI).

Immigration 
Strengthening Humanitarian Immigration – The Niskanen Center has argued that the United States best safeguards its national identity and global leadership by welcoming those refugees and other immigrants. Since then, Niskanen has hosted two Hill events focusing on the practical benefits of refugee resettlement to the U.S.

See also 
 Center-right politics
 Center-left politics
 Eco-capitalism
 Green libertarianism
 Liberaltarianism
 Libertarian paternalism
 Mixed economy
 Neoclassical liberalism
 Third Way
 Welfare capitalism

References

External links 
 

Political and economic think tanks in the United States
Think tanks based in Washington, D.C.
Non-profit organizations based in Washington, D.C.
Nonpartisan organizations in the United States
Foreign policy and strategy think tanks in the United States
Libertarian think tanks
Libertarian organizations based in the United States
501(c)(3) organizations
Environmental organizations based in Washington, D.C.
Climate change policy
Centrism